Makradeo is a village in Jhadol tahsil in Udaipur district of Rajasthan state of India. The village is just near Saradit village and hence both villages have same PIN code 313031.

References

Villages in Udaipur district